Narodowe Archiwum Cyfrowe (NAC; English: National Digital Archives) is the national archive of Poland, formed 8 March 2008 from the merger of the Archives of Audio-Visual Records and the State Archives of Poland. It acts as the national archive for Poland and holds the central archives of the Poland government. They are the state official archives and aim to provide digital files as a response to the development of recording, storing and access technologies

The vision of the NDA is to:

 archive digital materials, including digital documents
 archive photographs, films and sound recordings
 create digital files of hard copy materials
 share digital information and make the collection accessible online

See also 
Other three National Archives of Poland:
 Central Archives of Historical Records (Polish: Archiwum Główne Akt Dawnych)
 Central Archives of Modern Records (Polish: Archiwum Akt Nowych)
 National Archive of Personal and Wage Documentation (Polish: Archiwum Państwowe Dokumentacji Osobowej i Płacowej)

References

External links
National Digital Archives of Poland
  (video)

Poland
Polish digital libraries
Archives in Poland